Kalmatsky is a rural locality (a settlement) in Trusovsky Selsoviet, Kuryinsky District, Altai Krai, Russia. The population was 82 as of 2013. There is 1 street.

Geography 
Kalmatsky is located 24 km northeast of Kurya (the district's administrative centre) by road. Trusovo is the nearest rural locality.

References 

Rural localities in Kuryinsky District